Charles "Wave" Myers (June 7, 1926 – February 14, 2008) was an American football player and coach.  He served as the head football coach at Ball State University from 1968 to 1970, compiling a record of 15–14.

Head coaching record

College

References

1926 births
2008 deaths
Ball State Cardinals football coaches
Ball State Cardinals football players
High school football coaches in Indiana
Purdue University alumni
United States Army personnel of World War II